The Conchos shiner (Cyprinella panarcys) is a species of ray-finned fish in the  family Cyprinidae.
It is found only in Mexico.

References

Cyprinella
Freshwater fish of Mexico
Taxa named by Carl Leavitt Hubbs
Taxa named by Robert Rush Miller
Fish described in 1978
Taxonomy articles created by Polbot